Leucine-rich repeat transmembrane protein FLRT3 is a protein that in humans is encoded by the FLRT3 gene.

FLRT1, FLRT2 and FLRT3 are members of the fibronectin leucine rich transmembrane protein (FLRT) family. They may function in cell adhesion and/or receptor signalling. Their protein structures resemble small leucine-rich proteoglycans found in the extracellular matrix. FLRT3 shares 55% amino acid sequence identity with FLRT1 and 44% identity with FLRT2. FLRT3 is expressed in kidney, brain, pancreas, skeletal muscle, lung, liver, placenta, and heart. Two alternatively spliced transcript variants encoding the same protein have been described for this gene.

References

Further reading